Calliprason elegans is a longhorn beetle species in the genus Calliprason.

The type locality is near Tairua, New Zealand.

References

External links

Stenoderini
Beetles of New Zealand
Beetles described in 1877